Kevin Maagerø Gulliksen (born 9 November 1996) is a Norwegian handball player for Frisch Auf Göppingen and the Norwegian national team.

He participated at the 2019 World Men's Handball Championship.

References

External links
 
 
 Kevin Maagerø Gulliksen at the Norwegian Handball Federation 
 
 

1996 births
Living people
Norwegian male handball players
Expatriate handball players
Handball players from Oslo
Norwegian expatriate sportspeople in Germany
Handball-Bundesliga players
Handball players at the 2014 Summer Youth Olympics
Handball players at the 2020 Summer Olympics
Olympic handball players of Norway